Saint-Sébastien is a municipality in Le Haut-Richelieu Regional County Municipality in the Montérégie region of Quebec, Canada. The population as of the Canada 2021 Census was 692.

Demographics

Population

Language

See also
List of municipalities in Quebec

References

External links

Municipalities in Quebec
Incorporated places in Le Haut-Richelieu Regional County Municipality